The 1910–11 Kansas Jayhawks men's basketball team represented the University of Kansas during the 1910–11 NCAA men's basketball season, which was their 13th season. The Jayhawks, members of the MVIAA, were coached by W. O. Hamilton who was in his second year as head coach. The Jayhawks won their fourth consecutive MVIAA Championship and finished the season 12–6.

Roster
Donald Dousman
Robert Heizer
Thomas Johnson
Harold Larson
Verne Long
George Stuckey

Schedule and results
This schedule is incomplete.

References

Kansas Jayhawks men's basketball seasons
Kansas
Kansas Jayhawks Men's Basketball Team
Kansas Jayhawks Men's Basketball Team